The enzyme choline-sulfatase (EC 3.1.6.6) catalyzes the reaction

choline sulfate + H2O  choline + sulfate

This enzyme belongs to the family of hydrolases, specifically those acting on sulfuric ester bonds.  The systematic name is choline-sulfate sulfohydrolase.

References 

EC 3.1.6
Enzymes of unknown structure